The Sony FE 50mm F1.8 is a standard full-frame prime lens for the Sony E-mount, released by Sony in 2016.

The lens is one of Sony's first budget lens offerings for the 50mm focal length. Though designed for Sony's full frame E-mount cameras, the lens can be used on Sony's APS-C E-mount camera bodies, with an equivalent full-frame field-of-view of 75mm.

Build quality
The lens features a plastic exterior over plastic internals and a rubber focus ring. It showcases recessed front lens element, focusing ring, and a matte black finish. The lens is also one of Sony's only Full-Frame lenses lacking weather resistance.

See also
List of Sony E-mount lenses
Sony E 50mm F1.8 OSS
Sony FE 55mm F1.8 ZA

References

Camera lenses introduced in 2016
50